Saul Tzipori is an American microbiologist, currently the Agnes Varis University Chair and Distinguished Professor at Tufts University. He is a Fellow of the Royal College of Veterinary Surgeons.

References

Year of birth missing (living people)
Living people
Tufts University faculty
American microbiologists
University of Melbourne alumni
University of Queensland alumni